Ryan Forde Iosco is an actor and theatremaker.

Biography 
Ryan was born in Chicago, Illinois and trained as an actor at Tring Park School for the Performing Arts and the Royal Central School of Speech and Drama.

Voice work

Video games 
Anthem (2019) - Various characters
Pillars of Eternity II: Deadfire (2018) Player Voice and Various
 Lego Marvel Super Heroes 2 (2017) - Triton
 Mass Effect: Andromeda (2017) - Various Characters
 Dragon Age: Inquisition (2015) - Various Voices
 Magrunner: Dark Pulse (2013) - Kram Gruckezber

Radio plays 
 Doctor Who: The Vanity Trap (2020) - Dr Karp
Around the World in 80 Days (2019) - Commander
The War Master: The Coney Island Chameleon (2019) - Fletcher
 Missy: The Broken Clock (2019) - The Actor Playing Joe Lynwood
A Thousand Words (2015) - Mikey
 Doctor Who: Shield of the Jötunn (2015) - Bryce/Talessh

Commercials 
Ryan's voice has featured in commercials for brands such as: TRESSemé, Coca-Cola, Absolut, Samsung, Trebor, Axe, Universal Studios, Christies and many more.

Theatre Renegade 
Founded in 2012, Theatre Renegade is a theatre company based in the United Kingdom which produces socio-political theatre and has a strong focus on putting story, engagement and empathy at the heart of the theatrical experience. Ryan continues as the Artistic Director since its inception and created the infamous new writing night Courting Drama and political response night In Response To.

References

American theatre directors
American male voice actors
American male video game actors
Living people
Male actors from Chicago
Year of birth missing (living people)